Mohamed Ali Riad (13 May 1927 – 14 August 1958) was an Egyptian fencer. He competed in the individual and team foil events 1952 Summer Olympics. He was one of six members of the Egyptian fencing team who perished on board KLM Flight 607-E on 14 August 1958.

References

External links
 

1927 births
1958 deaths
Egyptian male foil fencers
Olympic fencers of Egypt
Fencers at the 1952 Summer Olympics
Victims of aviation accidents or incidents in international waters
Victims of aviation accidents or incidents in 1958